Darren Stewart (17 May 1966 – 18 October 2018) was an Australian association football player. He was an Australia national football team player and was named Australian Player of the Year in 1993.

Life and career
A defender, Stewart was a former notable player for APIA Leichhardt, Newcastle Breakers and Johor FA where he captained and won the Malaysia FA Cup in 1998.

Stewart was an Australia national football team player from 1991 to 1993.

He moved to Singapore in 1999, where he played for Balestier Central FC from 1999 to 2002. In 2002, he retired from playing football. He was the assistant manager for Balestier Khalsa FC's Prime League team in 2003 and assistant manager for the Geylang United FC team in 2004–2005.

He lived in Singapore where he coached and managed the Elias Park Football Club and was a coach for Little League Pte Ltd.

Stewart was named as head coach for Gombak United FC at the start of the 2009 S.League season. He joined the club as a technical analyst in late 2008.

In January 2012, Stewart was confirmed as Balestier Khalsa's head coach for the season 2012 S.League campaign. His time at Balestier were successful, as he guided the club to win the 2013 Singapore League Cup and 6th and 4th placings in the 2012 and 2013 league seasons respectively, the best positions by the club since merging from Balestier Central and Clementi Khalsa. However his contract was not renewed at the end of 2013. Stewart was then contracted to Woodlands Wellington F.C. at the start of 2014. Initially Stewart were successful, with 5-game unbeaten streak in the league and interest from hometown club Newcastle United Jets F.C. to be their head coach, which Stewart turns down to stay with the Singapore club. But after a string of poor results, culminating in a 7–1 thrashing at the hands of Albirex Niigata Singapore in June, Stewart resigned from his position at the club.

In July 2016, Stewart was appointed head coach of the Maldives national team.

Stewart died in Singapore on 18 October 2018 at the age of 52.

References

External links

1966 births
2018 deaths
Australian soccer players
Australia international soccer players
Expatriate footballers in Malaysia
APIA Leichhardt FC players
Blacktown City FC players
Balestier Khalsa FC players
Singapore Premier League head coaches
Balestier Khalsa FC head coaches
Woodlands Wellington FC head coaches
Gombak United FC head coaches
Maldives national football team managers
Association football defenders
Australian soccer coaches
Newcastle Breakers FC players
Sportspeople from Newcastle, New South Wales
Soccer players from New South Wales
Australian expatriate soccer coaches